Russian route R176 or Vyatka Highway is a Russian federal highway that runs from Cheboksary to Syktyvkar with a total length 872 km. The name comes from the Vyatka River and the historical name of the city of Kirov.

Before 2018, the road was designated A119.

References

Roads in Russia